Skotak is a surname. Notable people with the surname include:

 Dennis Skotak (born 1943), American visual effects artist
 Robert Skotak (born 1945), American filmmaker and visual effects artist